Ligidium japonicum is a species of woodlouse found in moist forests in Japan.

References

External links

Woodlice
Crustaceans of Japan
Crustaceans described in 1918